Jozef Brudňak (born 8 November 1987 in Svidník) is a Slovak football goalkeeper who currently plays for MFK Zemplín Michalovce, on loan from MFK Košice.

References

External links
 at mfkkosice.sk 

1987 births
Living people
Slovak footballers
Association football goalkeepers
FC VSS Košice players
MFK Zemplín Michalovce players
Slovak Super Liga players
People from Svidník
Sportspeople from the Prešov Region